The Vice-Admiral of Essex   was responsible for the defence of the county of Essex, England.

History
As a vice-admiral, the post holder was the chief of naval administration for his district. His responsibilities included pressing men for naval service, deciding the lawfulness of prizes (captured by privateers), dealing with salvage claims for wrecks and acting as a judge.

The earliest record of an appointment was of Richard Cornwallis in 1558.

In 1863 the Registrar of the Admiralty Court stated that the offices had 'for many years been purely honorary' (HCA 50/24 pp. 235–6). Appointments were made by the Lord High Admiral when this officer existed. When the admiralty was in commission appointments were made by the crown by letters patent under the seal of the admiralty court.

Vice-admirals of Essex

This is a list of people who have served as Vice-Admiral of Essex.

Richard Cornwallis 1558–?
Lewis David 1561–1575 jointly with
Richard Wyche 1561–1575
Thomas Ive 1576– jointly with
William Ive 1577–?
Philip Basset bef. 1580–1581
Edward de Vere, 17th Earl of Oxford 1581–1582
Clement Newce 1582–1584vacantHenry Bellingham 1585–1587 jointly withThomas Writington 1586–1587vacantGeorge Wood 1592–?
Francis Burnell bef. 1593–1599
Anthony Wingfield 1599–1609
William Sammes 1609–1611vacantRobert Rich, 2nd Earl of Warwick 1620–1649English InterregnumSir John Bramston 1661–1691
Edward Cary 1691–1692 (MP for Colchester)
Sir Isaac Rebow 1692–1702 (MP for Colchester)
Sir Charles Barrington, 5th Baronet 1702–1705
Richard Savage, 4th Earl Rivers 1705–1712
Sir Charles Barrington, 5th Baronet 1712–1714
Thomas Middleton 1714–1715 (MP for Essex)
Robert Honywood 1715–1735 (MP for Essex)
James Waldegrave, 1st Earl Waldegrave 1735–1741vacantWilliam Nassau de Zuylestein, 4th Earl of Rochford 1748–1781vacant''
John Griffin, 4th Baron Howard de Walden 1795–1797
Richard Griffin, 2nd Baron Braybrooke 1798–1825
Henry Maynard, 3rd Viscount Maynard 1825–1865
Thomas Trevor, 22nd Baron Dacre 1865–1869

References

External links
Institute of Historical Research*

Essex Review

Military ranks of the United Kingdom
Essex
Vice-Admirals
Vice-Admirals
E